The ArtParkS Sculpture Park sculpture trail is located in Saint Martin's, Guernsey, Channel Islands, in the grounds of the historic Sausmarez Manor.

It shows up to 200 mostly contemporary sculptures every year by approximately 70-80 artists from the United Kingdom and around the world.  It was opened by Charles Saumarez Smith CBE, who at the time was the director of the National Portrait Gallery in London.  The selection of sculpture is set in a sub tropical garden and changes every year with a grand opening, usually around the third week in May. Amenities include free parking, a bus stop and a cafe.

Founding and funding 
The ArtParkS Sculpture Park was founded in 1998 by Peter de Sausmarez and is self-funding.

Exhibits 
Occasionally solo exhibitions are shown. Most of the sculpture is for sale and there are some sculptures that are semi-permanent. There are occasional guided tours of the sculptures at certain times of the year.

Artists 
Some of the sculptural artists who have exhibited to date are:

Hours of operation 
Artparks Sculpture Garden is open daily, from 10am to 5pm.
There is a small charge for admission and free loan guides to the sculpture park available.

External links 
 Official website
 Sausmarez Manor Estate website

Sculpture gardens, trails and parks in Europe
Tourism in Guernsey
Museums in Guernsey
1998 establishments in Guernsey
Art galleries established in 1998